SK Senco Doubravka is a football club located in Pilsen, Czech Republic. The club plays in the Czech Fourth Division as of the 2020–21 season. The club was relegated from Divize A in the Czech Fourth Division at the end of the 2010–11 season, but won promotion back to the same division the following season.

References

External links
  

Football clubs in the Czech Republic
Association football clubs established in 1921
Sport in Plzeň